In neuroscience, saltatory conduction is the propagation of action potentials along myelinated axons from one node of Ranvier to the next node, increasing the conduction velocity of action potentials. The uninsulated nodes of Ranvier are the only places along the axon where ions are exchanged across the axon membrane, regenerating the action potential between regions of the axon that are insulated by myelin, unlike electrical conduction in a simple circuit.

Mechanism
Myelinated axons only allow action potentials to occur at the unmyelinated nodes of Ranvier that occur between the myelinated internodes. It is by this restriction that saltatory conduction propagates an action potential along the axon of a neuron at rates significantly higher than would be possible in unmyelinated axons (150 m/s compared to 0.5 to 10 m/s). As sodium rushes into the node it creates an electrical force which pushes on the ions already inside the axon. This rapid conduction of electrical signal reaches the next node and creates another action potential, thus refreshing the signal. In this manner, saltatory conduction allows electrical nerve signals to be propagated long distances at high rates without any degradation of the signal. Although the action potential appears to jump along the axon, this phenomenon is actually just the rapid conduction of the signal inside the myelinated portion of the axon.
If the entire surface of an axon were insulated, action potentials could not be regenerated along the axon resulting in signal degradation.

Energy efficiency

In addition to increasing the speed of the nerve impulse, the myelin sheath helps in reducing energy expenditure over the axon membrane as a whole, because the amount of sodium and potassium ions that need to be pumped to bring the concentrations back to the resting state following each action potential is decreased.

Distribution

Saltatory conduction occurs widely in the myelinated nerve fibers of vertebrates, but was later discovered in a pair of medial myelinated giant fibers of Fenneropenaeus chinensis and Marsupenaeus japonicus shrimp, as well as in a median giant fiber of an earthworm. Saltatory conduction has also been found in the small- and medium-sized myelinated fibers of Penaeus shrimp.

See also 

 Bioelectrochemistry
 Cable theory
 Electrophysiology

References

Further reading

External links 
Saltatory conduction - Scholarpedia
cell biology - Why is saltatory conduction in myelinated axons faster than continuous conduction in unmyelinated axons?

Neurophysiology

de:Erregungsleitung#Saltatorische Erregungsleitung